Rehaai is a 2013 Pakistani television drama serial directed by Mehreen Jabbar and written by Farhat Ishtiaq. It was aired on 18 March 2013 on the Hum TV. The serial stars Noman Ijaz, Samina Peerzada, Maria Wasti, Adnan Jilani, Rashid Farooqui, Yashal Nadeem, Nausheen Shah and Danish Taimoor. The drama series was produced by Kashf Foundation in collaboration with Momina Duraid. It highlights the stories of real-life Kashf clients, of the problems they face and have overcome with support for Kashf's microfinance services.
The serial focuses on child marriage which is an endemic issue that low income families face in many parts of Pakistan. It was very heartening to see that post the airing of the show a great deal of debate emerged on child marriage and the Sindh Marriage restraint Act was promulgated http://sindhlaws.gov.pk/setup/publications/PUB-13-000734.pdf

Plot
Rehaai is the story of Shamim, a woman married off when she was barely more than a child. Her brutish son Waseem is married to Shehnaz, a wife he uses as a convenient punching bag anytime he feels the need to vent his frustration, about anything and everything. The opening chapter revolved around Waseem’s increasingly vocal demand for an heir. Though Shehnaz has an unlikely ally in her mother-in-law, there is nonetheless a steady trickle of neighbors who drop in frequently to remind Shamim and Shehnaz of her inability to bear Waseem’s child. Out of all these "well-wishers," none is more insidious than chacha Inayat, who regularly fans the flames of Waseem’s desire to father a child. It is evident that Inayat is merely using Waseem’s childlessness as a means to further his own end, but the solution he offers is beyond macabre. Inayat offers up his own preteen child, Kulsoom as the bride, asserting that a younger woman can produce heirs much faster than an older woman such as Shehnaz. Waseem agrees to Inayat’s proposal and threatens his mother and wife of dire consequences if they stand in the way of his gaining the object of his desire. The story follows the consequences caused by this child marriage. Although Kulsum is Waseem's second wife, Shehnaz adores Kulsum as her daughter instead of hating her. Shameem's sister has a son Akmal. Akmal is helpful to Shameem, Shehnaz and Kulsum. He has a liking towards Kulsum. Kulsum grows and gives birth to 3 daughters which makes Waseem angry. He doubts that something in going between Akmal and Kulsum and so Waseem beats Akmal. Waseem does not earn even a single penny and so their condition becomes from bad to worse because of which Shameem is forced to become a maid. All the neighbours make fun of Shameem. Shameem's sister starts hating her because Waseem had beaten Akmal and tells Akmal not to help them. But Akmal could not see their condition and helps them secretly. He later convinces his mother. Meanwhile, Waseem has run out of the house and has married Noor Jahan. Noor Jahan had already married 2 times. But they do not get along as Waseem is a gharjamai and Noor Jahan's mother hates him. She throws him out of the house. Then he meets his long lost friend who was doing an illegal business of  gambling. Police attacks them and Waseem gets shot by a gun because of which he is handicapped. On the other hand, Shameem, Shehnaz and Kulsum had started a clothing business which makes Waseem jealous. One day when Shameem told Kulsum to go to Akmal's shop for calculation, Waseem shouts at her mother and tells her that she is solding Kulsum towards Akmal and so she is shameless. She tells "I'm shameless because I gave birth to such a child who spoilt a girl's life and her daughter-in-law's i.e Shehnaz life. He is in a shock. From that day Waseem feels guilty of what he had done and asks for forgiveness from Shameem, Shehnaz and Kulsum. They forgive and Waseem decides that Kulsum should marry Akmal. Chacha Inayat fights with Waseem but Waseem does not change his mind. But Kulsum thinks that she has no respect in society and she could not remarry. She tries to commit suicide. The very next day Shehnaz's sister comes and asks Kulsum's daughter's hand for her son. Shehnaz gets furious as she is very young and she does not want that what happened to her mother (Kulsum)to happen with Kulsum's daughter. Her daughter tells Waseem that she does not want to marry and wants to become a doctor. Shameem is listening to them and is scared if Waseem allows the marriage. But he encourages his daughter to study making Shameem happy. In this way Shameem gets freedom or Rehaai from the society's evil traditions making the show end on a happy note.

Cast 
 Noman Ijaz as Waseem
 Samina Peerzada as Shamim
 Maria Wasti as Shehnaz
 Adnan Jilani as Rashid, Waseem's Father (dead; seen on flashbacks)
 Munawar Saeed as Chacha Inayat, Kulsum's father
Rashid Farooqui
 Danish Taimoor as Akmal
 Seema Seher as Shakra; Akmal's Mother
 Saniya Shamshad as  Kulsoom
 Yashal Nadeem as Young Kulsum
 Nausheen Shah as Noorjahan; Waseem's Love Interest
 Sangeeta as Noorjahan's Mother
 Azra Mohyeddin as Nasreen Phoopo; Akmal's aunt
 Minal Khan as Teenage Shamim (only seen on flashbacks)
 Ubaida Ansari as Ammi Jan

Kashf Foundation 
Kashf Foundation is Pakistan's premier wealth management company for low income households. Founded in 1996, Kashf aims to alleviate poverty through the provision of financial and non-financial services for low-income households, particularly targeting women. Today, Kashf focuses on providing clients with the means to protect and manage their incomes and increase their productivity and resources. Kashf works to help women lead a life of dignity and empowerment through highlighting inequality and creating a platform to eradicate gender divisions.

Kashf partnered with Farat Ishtiaq, Mehreen Jabbar and Momil Productions to create a serial to highlight the issues faced by real-life Kashf clients. Rehaai focuses on low-income families and the daily issues women face in society including, second marriage, child marriage, access to education, domestic violence and economic exclusion. Kashf's Managing Director, Roshaneh Zafar says, Rehaai is a tribute to all the courageous women entrepreneurs in Pakistan, who have struggled against all odds to become business owners and operators.

International broadcast 
The show was also selected by Indian TV Channel Zindagi and aired from 13 August 2015 under the same title.

Accolades

13th Lux Style Awards
 Best Television Serial - Momina Duraid - Nominated
 Best Television Writer - Farhat Ishtiaq - Nominated
 Best Television Director - Mehreen Jabbar - Nominated
 Best Television Actress, Satellite - Samina Peerzada - Nominated
 Best Television Actor, Satellite - Nauman Ejaz - Nominated

References

External links 
 
 Kashf Foundation on Facebook

Hum TV original programming
Urdu-language television shows
Pakistani drama television series
2013 Pakistani television series debuts
2013 Pakistani television series endings
Mehreen Jabbar's directions
Child marriage in Pakistan